Roscommon is a barony in County Roscommon, Republic of Ireland.

Etymology
Roscommon barony is named after Roscommon town; however, it does not actually contain that town, which is located in Ballintober South.

Geography

Roscommon barony is located in the centre of County Roscommon, an area with many lakes including Lough Boderg. The only mountain is Slieve Bawn.

History

The Mag Oireachtaigh (Mageraghtys) were rulers here of Clann Tomaltaigh and the Muintir Roduib.

The Ó Fídhne (O'Feeney) were also in Roscommon barony. The O'Mulconaire were hereditary historians and bards.

The Ó Maoilbhreanainn (O'Mulrenan) sept were chiefs of Clann Chonchobhair (O'Conor).

It is referred to in the topographical poem Tuilleadh feasa ar Éirinn óigh (Giolla na Naomh Ó hUidhrín, d. 1420): 
OMaoilbrenaiin co mbladaiḃ
Ar Cloinn clármaoith Conċoḃair
A maicne os gaċ droing do dliġ
An aicme do Cloinn Chathail.
[...]
Ag Mág Oireaċtaiġ na n-each
Muintir Roduiḃ na righḃreaṫ
("O'Maoilbhrenainn with fame over the irriguous plain of Clann-Conchobhair, Their children are entitled to be above every tribe, that sept of the Clann-Cathail. [...] To Mac Oireachtaigh of the steeds belong Muintir Roduibh of royal judgments.")

List of settlements

Below is a list of settlements in Roscommon barony:
Elphin
Strokestown
Tulsk

See also
 Barony (Ireland)

References

Baronies of County Roscommon